Claude Arthur Allen (April 29, 1885 in Olean, New York – January 18, 1979 in Roselle, New Jersey) was an American track and field athlete who competed in the 1904 Summer Olympics and a college basketball head coach. In 1904, Allen placed fifth in the pole vault competition.

Allen coached the Niagara basketball team for the 1909–10 season and the St. John's basketball team for the 1910–11 season. Allen's St. John's team finished the season with a 14–0 record and was retroactively named the national champion by the Helms Athletic Foundation and the Premo-Porretta Power Poll.

In his college years, he attended and competed for Syracuse University.

References

External links
 

1885 births
1979 deaths
American male pole vaulters
Athletes (track and field) at the 1904 Summer Olympics
Niagara Purple Eagles athletic directors
Niagara Purple Eagles men's basketball coaches
Olympic track and field athletes of the United States
St. John's Red Storm men's basketball coaches
Syracuse Orange men's track and field athletes
People from Olean, New York
Sportspeople from New York (state)